Tarbutt (formerly known as Tarbutt and Tarbutt Additional) is a township in the Canadian province of Ontario, located within the Algoma District. Marie.

Its population centres are Port Findlay and MacLennan. It is the only municipality along the North Channel of Lake Huron which includes no residential communities located directly along Highway 17; MacLennan is located north of the highway at the intersection of MacLennan Road and Government Road, while Port Findlay is located at the south end of MacLennan Road along the waterfront.

In December 2016, the municipal council adopted a by-law to change the name of the township from The Corporation of the Township of Tarbutt & Tarbutt Additional to the Corporation of the Township of Tarbutt, effective in January 2017.

Demographics 

See also
List of townships in Ontario

References

External links

Municipalities in Algoma District
Single-tier municipalities in Ontario
Township municipalities in Ontario